Double, Double is a science fiction novel by American writer Michael Jan Friedman, part of the Star Trek: The Original Series franchise.

Plot
One android has survived the destruction of Roger Korby and his scientific facilities. The robot creates another Captain Kirk and fools the U.S.S. Hood with a distress signal. The Hoods command crew is soon overtaken by murderous androids and Kirk himself is framed for murder.

Kirk's android double takes over his command position on the Enterprise. The real Kirk rallies the survivors of the Hood and his own crew into destroying the android's threat.

References

External links

Novels based on Star Trek: The Original Series
1989 American novels
American science fiction novels
Novels by Michael Jan Friedman